Andhau Airstrip, Ghazipur is an airstrip, situated in Ghazipur in Uttar Pradesh, India. It is located on the Ghazipur-Mau Road, 7 kilometres from Ghazipur.
The airstrip is owned by the State Government.

Airlines and destinations 
The airport/airstrip has only unscheduled chartered flights.

Proposed airport
At present it doesn't has any basic facilities of airport like a terminal building or air traffic control. In January 2019, it was proposed to develop as an airport under UDAN III by central government. But nothing is done after that.

History
The airstrip was set up by the British Administration during World War II, is spread over 63 acres and has a 4,800 ft (1,463 m) runway with asphalt surface. It is located at an elevation of 230 ft (70 m) above mean sea level. In January 2019, SpiceJet was awarded routes to Kolkata and Delhi from this airport as part of the government's Regional Connectivity Scheme, UDAN III.

References

Airports in Uttar Pradesh
Proposed airports in Uttar Pradesh
Ghazipur
Transport in Ghazipur